Albert Sims (8 November 1871 – 18 September 1962) was an Australian cricketer. He played in two first-class matches for Queensland between 1910 and 1912.

See also
 List of Queensland first-class cricketers

References

External links
 

1871 births
1962 deaths
Australian cricketers
Queensland cricketers
Cricketers from Melbourne